The Dismissal is a musical with book by Blake Erickson and Jay James-Moody and music and lyrics by Laura Murphy. Dubbed "an extremely serious musical comedy", it is a satirical depiction of the 1975 Australian constitutional crisis.

It was scheduled to premiere as a Sydney Theatre Company and Squabbalogic co-production, performing at the Canberra Theatre from 9–24 October 2021 and the Sydney Opera House Drama Theatre from 29 October to 18 December 2021. However, the production was cancelled in August 2021 due to COVID-19 restrictions.

The Dismissal had a work-in-progress presentation at the Seymour Centre in 2019.

See also 
 The Dismissal (miniseries)

References 

Australian musicals
2021 musicals
1975 Australian constitutional crisis